The Royal Commission of Inquiry into Abuse in Care is a royal commission established in 2018 by the New Zealand government pursuant to the Inquiries Act 2013 to inquire into and report upon responses by institutions to instances and allegations of historical abuse in state care and faith based institutions between 1950 and 2000.

History

Creation 
On 4 December 2017, after an open letter from ActionStation signed by many taken to Parliament, Cabinet agreed to establish an inquiry into abuse in state care under the Inquiries Act 2013. It also agreed that a Ministerial Working Group be set up to consider the potential scope and implementation of the Inquiry, led by the Minister for Children/of Internal Affairs supported by the Minister for Social Development. The terms of the inquiry were announced in November 2018, and at that time the scope was widened from covering abuse in state care to include abuse in faith based institutions.

A gathering of survivors and advocates met with those appointed at Victoria University to talk about the Inquiry and terms of reference.
This was then decided and collated with input and approval of those who attended.

The Department of Internal Affairs is now responsible for administering the independent Inquiry. The Rt Hon Sir Anand Satyanand was appointed as the Inquiry Chair and member of the Inquiry. Prime Minister Jacinda Ardern and Minister for Children Tracey Martin gave details of the inquiry which was formally established on 1 February 2018.

Resignation of chair and pandemic delays 
In August 2019, Satyanand announced his resignation from the commission. In a surprise announcement, he cited the growing workload, which was higher than predicted, and his age of 75. He left the Commission in November 2019 and became the chancellor of Waikato University. Coral Shaw took over as chair, and Julia Steenson joined the Commission in June 2020.

The work of the commission was delayed by the COVID-19 pandemic in New Zealand, with reduced sessions from March through June 2020.

Interim reports 
The Commission released its first interim report on 16 December 2020. The report estimated that about a quarter of a million people were abused in state-based and faith-based care, though this figure may be conservative and it will be impossible to determine the precise number of people abused, because of data gaps and deficiencies. It reported that most of the abused came from Maori and Pacific families, disabled people, and women and girls. It found that abusive behaviour ranged from common physical assaults and sexual abuse through to unreasonable physical restraint, cruel, inhuman and degrading treatment, and medical procedures such as ECT therapy as punishment. The commission's interim report said the state's redress processes so far had been overly focused on financial implications to the state, rather than on providing appropriate compensation to survivors and ensuring their wellbeing. It also said that survivors who made claims were frequently disbelieved and forced to retell their experiences again and again, retraumatising them.

On 15 December 2021, the Commission released a second interim report which found that survivors' requests for redress were often rejected by authorities or their abuse downplayed, disbelieved or dismissed. The Commission found that agencies and institutions responsible for the abuse denied there was a systemic problem and feared the potential financial cost of settling with claimants. The commission also criticised the inadequacy of the current redress systems at government agencies and faith-based institutions. As a result, the inquiry made 95 recommendations including the creation of a new redress process and a public apology to survivors. The commission also recommended that the Government enact legislation enshrining that children in care should be protected from abuse and that the Government be held liable for any such abuses.

In response to the commission's 2021 report, Prime Minister Ardern refused to confirm whether the Government would adopt the commission's   recommendation that children in state care should be legally protected from abuse. In mid-December 2021, the Government's Oversight of Oranga Tamariki System and Children and Young People's Commission Bill passed its first reading. The proposed Bill deals with oversight of the government department Oranga Tamariki, which is responsible for looking after children in state care. During the submission stage, several submissions expressed concern that the legislation would weaken oversight of Oranga Tamariki.

Hearings

Lake Alice Psychiatric Hospital
On 14 June 2021, the Abuse in Care Inquiry began hearing from former young patients at the Lake Alice Psychiatric Hospital. During the 1970s, patients were reportedly subjected to massive doses of medication and electroconvulsive therapy as a punishment. There are 40 witnesses including 20 former patients.

Marylands School, Christchurch 
Between 9–17 February 2022, the Abuse in Care Inquiry began hearing from survivors of child sexual abuse perpetrated by The Hospitaller Order of St John of God at Marylands School, St Joseph's Orphanage and the Hebron Trust. Marylands School was a residential facility for boys, including many with disabilities.

The Commission investigated the nature and extent of the abuse that occurred, why it happened and the impacts of that abuse.

Dr Christopher Longhurst, from the Survivors Networks of those Abused by Priests (SNAP) labelled St John of God's apologies as hollow. Longhurst pointed out that church leaders initially opposed that faith-based institutions be included in the commission. Longhurst said ...where was their shame decades ago when child victims and their parents first reported abuse? Where was their shames when disgraced brothers were shipped overseas instead of facing justice? Where was their shame when some of their victims took their own lives? 

Longhurst described Marylands School as ...a state supported church-run brothel that serviced the needs of paedophiles.

In addition to survivor testimonies, the commission also heard evidence from survivor advocates, former employees of St John of God, NZ Police and Brother Timothy Graham, the current Provincial of St John of God.

The Commission heard that despite its small size, the Order of St John of God was responsible for 14% of all recorded abuse in New Zealand's Catholic Church.

A former nun, Dr Michelle Mulvihill told the Commission she had been employed by St John of God to respond to hundreds of sexual abuse claims in Australia and New Zealand. Ian 2002, Mulvihill made 13 trips to New Zealand and met scores of victims, some in prison, many homeless and others suffering mental health problems. She was sent to negotiate settlements with the victims and told the Commission she believed 91% of religious brothers at Marylands were abusing children.

Mulvihill said the Order had a culture of concealing abuse perpetrated by its members and in 2002, an Australian class action ensured the identities of sex offenders within the Order of St John of God was kept secret. Over 120 complaints were made about abuse at Marylands and the majority against the notorious Brother Bernard McGrath. The now deceased principal, Brother Roger Moloney, was sentenced to 35 month's jail for sexually abusing children. Other brothers, including Raymond Garchow, William Lebler and Celsus Griffin were all named as child sex abusers.

Mulvihill said that Lebler was allowed to answer calls from victims, even after allegations had been made against him. Moloney, who was sentenced to prison in New Zealand for child abuse, played a prominent role in Australian settlements as the Order's bursar.

Mulvihill said St John of God's protection of its ...outrageous wealth, its members deviant sexual behaviour and their obedience to 'closing ranks' was indefensible and unforgivable. 

In her closing statement, Chair Coral Shaw said ...the shocking abuse included and is admitted, included grooming, child rape, vicious physical abuse and neglect, neglect of the vulnerable children's need for nature and education. We acknowledge and applaud the willingness of the survivors to share these painful experiences and describe the lifelong impacts they have to continue to endure.

Māori plaintiffs
On 7 March 2022, the Royal Commission began hearing from Māori individuals who had experienced abuse as children while in state and faith–based care. The hearing is expected to last for two weeks until 18 March and is hosted by Ngāti Whātua at Ōrākei marae. The first plaintiff Tupua Urlich testified about how he and his sister were separated from their mother and experienced abuse at the hands of a caregiver.

On 8 March, five Waikato siblings testified about being beaten and exploited as child labour by their foster family between the late 1990s and 2001. Though Oranga Tamariki was aware about the abuse experienced by the children, the department opted to work with their foster family instead of rehousing the children.  Following four years of abuse, one of the children spoke to a school counsellor who successfully petitioned for the children's removal from the foster family. The children subsequently were separated when they were rehomed with different families and testified about their loss of connection to Māori culture and identity.

On 9 March, a plaintiff named Ms AF testified that welfare authorities erased her Māori birth mother from her birth certificate to facilitate her assimilation into a Catholic Pakeha/European family. Ms AF talked about being cut off from her Māori family and identity. She also claimed that she had been sexually abused by an uncle during her childhood and that she was raped by an acquaintance of her uncle as a teenager.

On 16 March, a plaintiff known as "MM" testified about encountering violence, sexual abuse, bullying, and racism while in state care. "MM" also claimed that his Māori heritage was denigrated while in state care. Due to his abuse, "MM" became involved in gangs and spent most of his adult life in prison. On 17 March, another plaintiff named Natasha Emery attributed the "intergenerational abuse" experienced by her and her family to the abuse they had experienced in state and foster care.

On 18 March, the Royal Commission concluded its two-week hearing into Māori experiences of abuse in state care. The Commission covered a range of issues including family separations, children experiencing psychical, psychological and sexual abuse in state care, slave labour, forced assimilation, and a failure by relevant authorities to address such abuses.

State foster care plaintiffs
Between 13 and 17 June 2022, the Royal Commission of Inquiry heard from individuals who had experienced abuse in state foster care. This marked the twelfth public hearing carried out by the Royal Commission of Inquiry investigating historical abuse in both state and faith-based care between 1950 and 1999.

Plaintiffs testified that they experienced beatings, forced labour, malnutrition, sexual abuse, neglect, force-feeding, and losing contact with their birth families. Several plaintiffs also criticised social workers for not intervening to protect them from abuse at the hands of their foster parents and carers. Survivors also talked about the long term effects of their abuse including being unable to form relationships as adults, crime, and alcoholism. Former social workers and academics Professor Emily Keddell and Dr Ian Hyslop called for an institutional reform of the child and family welfare and protection system, with particularly attention to the needs of Māori.

Disabled, deaf, and mental health institution care
On 11 July 2022, the Royal Commission of Inquiry began hearing from 23 disabled, deaf, and  mental health institutional care plaintiffs who had experienced abuse at several state institutions between 1950 and 1999. These institutions have included the Kimberley Centre, the Templeton Centre, Porirua Hospital, Tokanui Psychiatric Hospital, the Kelston Deaf Education Centre, Homai School, Carrington Hospital, Kingseat Hospital, and Māngere Hospital. Plaintiffs testified that they had experienced beatings, being overprescribed medicines, forced feeding, starvation, sexual abuse (including rape), and neglect at the hands of staff members.

After eight days of testimonies, the Royal Commission of Inquiry into disability, deaf, and mental health institutional care concluded its hearings. In addition to accounts of physical, mental, and sexual abuse, several Māori and Pasifika plaintiffs testified that they had received racist abuse and discrimination. Former patient Caroline Arrell advocated the establishment of a Ministry of Vulnerable Adults to provide care and monitoring for disabled individuals. Another patient Allison Campbell called for people in care to receive an independent non-governmental advocate. Mike Ferris of the Citizens Commission for Human Rights praised the hearing for shedding light on decades of abuse and called for a holistic approach to engaging with disabled individuals.

Mongrel Mob
On 13 August 2022, former Lake Alice psychiatric hospital patient Paul Zentveld met at a weekend hui (meeting) in Raglan organised by the Waikato chapter of the Mongrel Mob to encourage members to participate in the Royal Commission of Inquiry into Abuse in Care in order to seek redress. Several gang members had lived at boys' institutions including Epuni in Lower Hutt and Kohitere Boy's Training Centre in Levin where they had experienced abuse and mistreatment.

State agencies
In mid-August 2022, the Royal Commission of Inquiry began hearing testimony from state agencies, focusing on their failure to address the abuse of children in their care between 1950 and 1999. The hearing was expected to last for ten days and heard testimonies from 14 stage agencies including Oranga Tamariki (the Ministry of Children), the New Zealand Police, the Department of Corrections, Te Puni Kōkiri (the Ministry for Māori Development), the Ministry for Pacific Peoples, the Ministry of Social Development (MSD), Ministry of Education, Whaikaha - Ministry of Disabled People, and the Ministry of Health. The Royal Commission questioned the state agencies about their efforts to meet their Treaty of Waitangi obligations, monitoring of systems for abuse and neglect, and how they handled complaints.

On 16 August, the Ministry of Social Development's chief executive Debbie Power was questioned by the Royal Commission. The Commission's counsel Anne Toohey submitted evidence about the Ministry's failure to monitor abuse at various institutions under its supervision including Horowhenua's Kohitere Boys Training Centre, which attracted 228 complaints covering 812 allegations of sexual, physical and emotional abuse. While Power testified that MSD had enacted policies to address these complaints, Toohey questioned why the Ministry had allowed an employee facing allegations of abuse to remain in their employment at a youth justice facility.

On 17 August, Police Commissioner Andrew Coster and Deputy Commissioner Tania Kura  admitted that children had been abused in police custody during the 1970s and 1980s. The commission had also earlier heard plaintiffs testifying about racism and beatings including teenagers being beaten with phone books in order not to leave marks on their bodies.

On 21 August, Teaching Council of Aotearoa New Zealand chief executive Lesley Hoskin confirmed that it was taking action to ensure that teachers could demonstrate competence in the Māori language and culture in order to address the over-representation of Māori children in state care and abuse.

On 22 August, Oranga Tamariki's chief executive Chappie Te Kani admitted that the state agency had made multiple failings in preventing and reporting the abuse of children in its care. Te Kani acknowledged that Oranga Tamariki had not believed reports of abuse and failed to investigate them, leading to a lack of accountability for perpetrators and increasing the risk of abuse and harm suffered by victims. Te Kani also stated that the child care and protection system that existed between 1950 and 1999 had failed to meet the needs of mentally disabled, Māori and Pasifika children. Te Kani also acknowledged that Oranga Tamariki's poor data collection practices meant that the organisation had no figures on Māori and Pasifika children entrusted to its care. Deputy chief executive Nicolette Dickson also acknowledged that the agency's failings had created mistrust between Māori and European New Zealanders (Pakeha) involved in state care.

On 24 August, the Royal Commission released its Care to Custody: Incarceration Rates Research Report, which found that children in state care had a higher rate of imprisonment as adults. The report found that one third of children living in state care later served prison sentences. In addition, the report found that Māori children and young people had a higher rate of imprisonment than other ethnic groups, with 42% later serving custodial sentences as adults. The report drew upon the interagency records of more than 30,000 children and young people between 1950 and 1999. The Care to Custody report was welcomed as a vindication by former state care wards Hohepa Taiaroa and Arthur William Taylor, who attributed their state care experiences to their descent into the prison system as adults. On 25 August, the Royal Commission questioned the Department of Corrections over the management of imprisoned state care abuse survivors. During questioning, Juanita Ryan, Corrections' deputy chief executive of health services, admitted that the department did not have specific therapeutic programmes for prisoners who had been former state wards.

On 26 August, the Royal Commission's hearing into state institutions' responses to the abuse of children and young people in state care concluded. Public Service Commissioner Peter Hughes apologised on behalf of the Government to former state care wards for failing to protect them from abuse while in state care and for MSD's mismanagement of their claims, which had caused them further harm. Hughes also stated that the Government had "lost sight of the human beings at the centre of the claims." Hughes also called on Oranga Tamariki to listen to the needs of children. Several survivors including Keith Wiffin, Frances Tagaloa, and Jim Goodwin accepted the Government's apology but called for the establishment of an independent service monitoring state care services and for more accountability from state agencies.

Faith-based institutions
The Commission heard from the leaders of several faith-based institutions between 13 and 20 October 2022 in Auckland. Institutions that participated in the hearing included the Gloriavale Christian Community, Dilworth School, St Patrick's College, Silverstream, Wesley College, and the leaders of the Anglican Church in Aotearoa, New Zealand and Polynesia, the Catholic Church in New Zealand, the Methodist Church of New Zealand, the Presbyterian Church of Aotearoa New Zealand and its social outreach ministries Presbyterian Support Central and Presbyterian Support Otago. In addition to being questioned on how they addressed abuse allegations by survivors, the organisations were questioned about the monitoring of care systems, how those in care were protected from abuse, and how they met their Treaty of Waitangi, Māori, Pacific, disabled, and mental health obligations. This hearing was convened in response to a 2021 report criticising faith-based institutions for failing to protect children in their care. This hearing is the final hearing before commissioners assess the information gathered in the Royal Commission of Inquiry and issue a report to the Governor-General of New Zealand in June 2023.

On 13 October, Gloriavale leader Howard Temple testified before the Royal Commission, acknowledging that there had been intergenerational abuse at the insular religious community. Gloriavale's leadership also confirmed that they had instituted reforms including allowing family members to spend more time together and implementing new policies around child protection, bullying and sexual harassment, and external investigations of abuse allegations.

Between 17 and 18 October, the Royal Commission heard from several Catholic representatives including Bishop Patrick Dunn, Cardinal John Dew, the Society of Mary's Father Tim Duckworth, St Patrick's College Silverstream's Clare Couch and Dr Paul Flanagan of the Church's National Safeguarding and Professional Standards Committee, who apologised for abuse against children and young people in the care of Catholic institutions. In addition, the Royal Commission also heard from several abuse survivors including Dr Filip Katavake-McGrath and Moeapulu Frances Tagaloa. The Commission had heard at least 1,680 reports of abuse including sexual, physical and emotional abuse at Catholic institutions between 1950 and 1999. Bishop Dunn was also questioned for recommending Tongan priest Sateki Raass, who was subsequently convicted for sexually assaulting a minor, for a teaching job.

On 19 October, former Dilworth principal Murray Wilton apologised for sexual abuses committed by twelve former staff members who had been charged and prosecuted as part of the Operation Beverly police investigation. On 20 October, Dilworth Trust chairman Aaron Snodgrass appeared before the Royal Commission and testified that the school was taking action to address historical abuse including an independent inquiry and a redress programme. Abuse survivors including Neil Harding and Greg Evans criticised Dilworth's redress efforts for allegedly marginalising survivors and disputed claims by the school's leadership denials of a cover-up of abuse that had occurred at Dilworth.

On 19 October, the Methodist Church of NZ and Wesley College representatives publicly apologised to abuse survivors for bullying and abuse that former students had experienced. Methodist Church general secretary Reverend Tara Tautari apologised on behalf of the church for failing to protect and look after the well-being of those entrusted to its care. The church's lawyer Maria Dew KC confirmed that the church had resolved or was in the process of resolving 20 of its 28 redress claims. Wesley College alumni and Moana Pasifika rugby player Sekope Kepu also testified about the abuse he had experienced and talked about his former school's efforts to address bullying. 

On 20 October, Presbyterian Support Otago (PSO) chief executive Jo O'Neill testified about historical abuses that had occurred at its Glendining Presbyterian Children's Homes in Andersons Bay in Dunedin. Three of the abuses had occurred between 1950 and 1960 while three of the abuses had occurred between the late 1980s and 1991. O'Neill also testified that records about children housed under PSO's care had been deliberately destroyed by an alleged paedophile ring between 2017 and 2018. O'Neill also apologised to abuse survivors. In response to O'Neill's testimony, the Presbyterian Church of Aotearoa New Zealand launched an inquiry into an alleged pedophile ring operating within Dunedin's Presbyterian community. On 5 November, the Presbyterian Church in Dunedin confirmed that it had appointed a King's Counsel to investigate the paedophile ring allegations.

Final report 
The Commission intends to release a final report with recommendations to the government. This is due to be produced by 3 January 2023.

Responses 
On 26 March 2021, Cardinal John Dew, the Archbishop of Wellington and president of New Zealand Catholic Bishops Conference, apologised to abuse victims in the Royal Commission of Inquiry and stated that its systems and culture must change.

Commissioners 
 Judge Coral Shaw – Chair
 Sandra Alofivae MNZN – Commissioner
 Dr Andrew Erueti – Commissioner
 Paul Gibson – Commissioner
 Julia Steenson – Commissioner
Anand Satyanand is a former commissioner. Simon Mount QC is the commission's Counsel Assist.

Criticisms 
The inquiry faced criticism for appointing a gang member into a key role. Mongrel Mob member Harry Tam was employed as the inquiry's head of policy and research.

An abuse survivor accused the Commission of shutting down questions into conflicts of interest, saying that when he asked about commissioners' involvement with religious organisations, commissioners intervened to prevent further questions. The survivor received two letters of apology over the incident.

It was also criticised after some survivors were unclear on whether interviews they had done were part of the official hearings or were 'mock' sessions. Some survivors were concerned that evidence from those sessions would not be used and that they would need to repeat traumatising sessions. Commissioner Sandra Alofivae said that the interviews were official and evidence from them would be used, describing the sessions as "soft pilots".

A child sex offender was allowed to attend meetings with sexual violence survivors. The man, who is on the child sex offender register, was a partner of a person attending a panel. The Commission took three months after learning that the man had convictions to determine what they were. Internal Affairs Minister Tracey Martin said that her confidence in the commissioner "had been shaken" but later expressed confidence in the commission. Senior Commissioner Paul Gibson faced calls to resign but refused to do so.

In April 2021 it was revealed that the commission had asked for three emergency funding top-ups totalling $20 million. Internal Affairs Minister Jan Tinetti, who is the minister responsible for the inquiry, said it was not poor financial management but a learning curve on how big the work would be.

References

External links 
 Official website

Government of New Zealand
Working groups
Children's rights in New Zealand
Human rights abuses in New Zealand
Royal commissions in New Zealand